Sergeant John Benton is a fictional character in the British science fiction television series Doctor Who, played by John Levene. He was the senior NCO of the British contingent of UNIT, an international organisation that defends Earth from alien threats. He appeared semi-regularly on the programme from 1968 to 1975, and was eventually promoted to the rank of Warrant Officer Class 1, holding the post of Regimental Sergeant Major.

Character history
Benton first appeared in the Second Doctor serial The Invasion (1968), when he was just a corporal in UNIT. By the time of his next appearance in The Ambassadors of Death (1970) he had been promoted to Sergeant and quickly formed a close relationship with the Doctor, Captain Mike Yates and Brigadier Lethbridge-Stewart, the latter usually calling first for Benton when an order needed to be carried out. Benton's tour in UNIT also coincided with the tenure of the Third and Fourth Doctors as its Scientific Advisor, and his promotion to WO1 occurred immediately prior to Robot (1974–75).

During his time with UNIT, Benton faces several alien invaders, including the Cybermen, the Daleks, and the Nestene forces. He had many run-ins with the renegade Time Lord known as the Master. Benton was always a down-to-earth example of a British infantryman and non-commissioned officer, being reliable, loyal, uncomplicated and possessing a good dose of common sense. When the Doctor asked him if he was going to comment that the TARDIS was bigger on the inside than on the outside (since everyone else has), Benton's classic reply was, "Well, that's pretty obvious, isn't it?" Aside from the regular companions and the Brigadier, Benton is the only recurring character in the classic series to travel in the TARDIS.

While not understanding the specifics of what the Doctor was doing or any of his explanations, Benton always took the Doctor at his word and trusted him implicitly. Benton was loyal, not just to the rank but also to the people he worked with, and was willing to disobey orders to help them (in Invasion of the Dinosaurs, he encouraged the Doctor to knock him out and "escape" after the Doctor was falsely accused). He even willingly offers himself as a test subject for the Doctor's psychic-scanner, remarking that unlike the Doctor, he is expendable (Planet of the Spiders).

Very little is known of Benton outside of his UNIT duties, other than the fact he has a younger sister and is apparently fond of ballroom dancing. In fact, his first name was never revealed in the television series. He flirted briefly with Jo Grant, the Third Doctor's assistant, and also Sarah Jane Smith, but neither appeared to get beyond good-natured bantering.

Benton's last on-screen appearance in the series was in The Android Invasion. In Mawdryn Undead, set in 1983, he was said by the retired Brigadier Lethbridge-Stewart to have left the British Army in 1979 and become a used car salesman.

As one of the most popular recurring supporting characters in the television series, Benton is often listed as a companion of the Doctor and indeed is listed as such on the official BBC Doctor Who website. However, he is not always listed as such - John Nathan-Turner's book Doctor Who: The Companions, for instance, excludes Benton.

Benton is one of the few adult characters to have also been portrayed by child actors in the pre-2005 "classic era" of Doctor Who, to wit: baby Darren Plant in The Time Monster and adolescent Steven Stanley in the direct-to-video Wartime.

Other appearances
The prologue of the Virgin Publishing novelisation of The Power of the Daleks by John Peel revealed that Benton did return to UNIT at some point and became a commissioned officer with the rank of Lieutenant (OF-1). In 1986, he led a UNIT team to Antarctica to clear up the mess left in the wake of the Cybermen's failed attempt to drain Earth of its energy (The Tenth Planet).

John Levene reprised the role of Benton in the spin-off video Wartime, produced by Reeltime Pictures in 1987.  This finally established a first name for Benton: John, just like the actor who played him. Levene and Terrance Dicks actually determined this during UNIT's early 1970s heyday, though it was not used in any official production before Wartime.  The name "John Benton" has subsequently been used in many spin-off novels and other fiction.

In 2013, Levene reprised the role again for the Big Finish Companion Chronicle Council of War (set some time after The Green Death) and reprised the role in 'UNIT: Assembled' (2017) alongside Richard Franklin as Mike Yates.

Benton appears alongside the Sixth Doctor in the unlicensed fan fiction novel Time's Champion by Chris McKeon, based on notes by Craig Hinton.

List of appearances

Television

Season 6
The Invasion (Episodes 1 – 2, 3 (voice only) & 5 – 8)
Season 7
The Ambassadors of Death (Episodes 5 & 7)
Inferno
Season 8
Terror of the Autons (Episodes 1, 2 & 4)
The Mind of Evil (Episodes 2 – 6)
The Claws of Axos
The Dæmons
Season 9
Day of the Daleks (Episodes 1 – 2 & 4)
The Time Monster (Episodes 1 – 4 & 6)
Season 10
The Three Doctors
The Green Death (Episodes 4 – 6)
Season 11
Invasion of the Dinosaurs
Planet of the Spiders (Episodes 1 & 2)
Season 12
Robot
Season 13
Terror of the Zygons
The Android Invasion (Episodes 2 – 4)

Video
Wartime

Audio drama
The Blue Tooth (adventure related by the character Liz Shaw)
The Doll of Death (adventure related by the character Jo Grant)
The Magician's Oath (adventure related by the character Captain Mike Yates)
Find and Replace (adventure related by the character Jo Grant)
The Rings of Ikiria (adventure related by the character Captain Mike Yates)
Council of War (starring John Levene and Sinead Keenan)
The Scream of Ghosts (full cast audio with John Levene as Benton)

Novels
Virgin Missing Adventures
Dancing the Code by Paul Leonard
The Eye of the Giant by Christopher Bulis
The Scales of Injustice by Gary Russell

Past Doctor Adventures
The Devil Goblins from Neptune by Martin Day and Keith Topping
The Face of the Enemy by David A. McIntee
Deep Blue by Mark Morris
Verdigris by Paul Magrs
Rags by Mick Lewis
Deadly Reunion by Terrance Dicks and Barry Letts

Eighth Doctor Adventures
The Eight Doctors by Terrance Dicks
Genocide by Paul Leonard

Independent Novels
Time's Champion by Craig Hinton and Chris McKeon

Short stories
"Brief Encounter—Listening Watch" by Dan Abnett (Doctor Who Magazine Winter Special 1991)
"Prisoners of the Sun" by Tim Robins (Decalog; parallel universe version of Benton)
"The Switching" by Simon Guerrier (Short Trips: Zodiac)
"An Overture Too Early" by Simon Guerrier (Short Trips: The Muses)
"UNIT Christmas Parties: Christmas Truce" by Terrance Dicks (Short Trips: A Christmas Treasury)

Comics
"The Man in the Ion Mask" by Dan Abnett and Brian Williamson (Doctor Who Magazine Winter Special 1991)
"Target Practice" by Gareth Roberts and Adrian Salmon (Doctor Who Magazine #234, 17 January 1996)

See also
UNIT
List of Doctor Who supporting characters

References

External links

 Sergeant Benton on the BBC's Doctor Who website

Television characters introduced in 1968
UNIT personnel
Recurring characters in Doctor Who
Fictional corporals
Fictional military sergeants
Fictional British Army personnel
Fictional warrant officers
British male characters in television